Boortmeerbeek is a town in the Belgian province of Flemish Brabant. The municipality comprises the towns of Boortmeerbeek proper, Schiplaken and Hever. The total area is 18.64 km² which gives a population density of 620 inhabitants per km².

Related people
 Jan van Muysen, built the church in 1451
 Charles de Santa Cruz; knight, lord of Boortmeerbeek; married to Susanne de Molenare.
 Juan Franscisco de Santa Cruz, Lord of Boortmeerbeek, married to Marie Antoinette Baltine Tucher.

See also
 Twentieth convoy

References

Televisiedecor
Boortmeerbeek is meerdere malen een decor voor series op tv geweest. De bekende serie nonkel jef werd er grotendeels opgenomen en ook familie is vaak te gast in Boortmeerbeek voor opnames.

External links
 
 boortmeerbeek.be
 XXste Konvooi
 Heemkring Ravensteyn
 Boortmeerbeek.org

Municipalities of Flemish Brabant